Rubén Oscar Cocimano  (born 5 February 1962 in Quilmes) is a former Argentine football player.

Club career
Cocimano played for River Plate and Atlanta in the Primera División Argentina. He also spent several seasons with LDU Portoviejo and Deportivo Cuenca in Serie A de Ecuador.

See also
Football in Argentina
List of football clubs in Argentina

References

External links
 Interview with Rubén Oscar Cocimano

1962 births
Living people
People from Quilmes
Argentine footballers
Club Atlético River Plate footballers
Club Atlético Atlanta footballers
Atlético Tucumán footballers
Nueva Chicago footballers
Defensa y Justicia footballers
C.D. Cuenca footballers
Argentine Primera División players
Argentine expatriate footballers
Expatriate footballers in Ecuador
Association football midfielders
Sportspeople from Buenos Aires Province